Half-caste  (an offensive term for the offspring of parents of different racial groups or cultures) is a term used for individuals of multiracial descent. It is derived from the term caste, which comes from the Latin castus, meaning pure, and the derivative Portuguese and Spanish word casta, meaning race. Terms such as half-caste, caste, quarter-caste and mix-breed were used by colonial officials in the British Empire during their classification of indigenous populations, and in Australia used during the Australian government's pursuit of a policy of assimilation. In Latin America, the equivalent term for half-castes was Cholo and Zambo.

Use by region

Australia

In Australia, the term "half-caste", along with any other proportional representation of Aboriginality (such as "part-aborigine", "full-blood", "quarter-caste", "octoroon", "mulatto", or "hybrid") is generally used as a harmless descriptor but may be seen as highly offensive to some Aboriginal peoples of Australia partly for historical reasons, as it is associated with assimilationist policies of the past. Such terms were widely used in the 19th- and early-20th-century Australian laws to refer to the offspring of European and Aboriginal parents. For example, the Aborigines Protection Act 1886 mentioned half-castes habitually associating with or living with an "Aborigine" (another term no longer favoured), while the Aborigines Amendments between 1934 and 1937 refer to it in various terms, including as a person with less than quadroon blood.

The term was not merely a term of legal convenience; it became a term of common cultural discourse. Christian missionary John Harper, investigating the possibility of establishing of a Christian mission at Batemans Bay, New South Wales, wrote that half-castes and anyone with any Aboriginal connections were considered "degraded as to divine things, almost on a level with a brute, in a state of moral unfitness for heaven".

The term "Half-Caste Act" was given to Acts of Parliament passed in Victoria and Western Australia allowing the seizure of half-caste children and forcible removal from their parents. This was theoretically to provide them with better homes than those afforded by typical Aboriginal people, where they could grow up to work as domestic servants and for social engineering. The removed children are now known as the Stolen Generations. Other Australian Parliament acts on half-castes and Aboriginal people enacted between 1909 and 1943 were often called "Welfare Acts", but they deprived these people of basic civil, political, and economic rights, and made it illegal to enter public places such as pubs and government institutions, marry, or meet relatives.

British Central Africa

In British Central Africa, now part of modern-day Malawi and Zimbabwe, people of multiracial descent were referred to as half-castes. These unions were considered socially improper, with mixed couples being segregated and shunned by society at large, and colonial courts passing legislation against mixed marriages.

Burma

In Burma, a half-caste (or Kabya) was anyone with mixed ethnicity from Burmese and British, or Burmese and Indian. During the period of colonial rule, half-caste people were ostracised and criticised in Burmese literary and political media.  For example, a local publication in 1938 published the following:

Similarly, Pu Gale in 1939 wrote Kabya Pyatthana (literally: The Half-Caste Problem), censured Burmese women for enabling half-caste phenomenon, with the claim, "a Burmese woman’s degenerative intercourse with an Indian threatened a spiraling destruction of Burmese society." Such criticism was not limited to a few isolated instances, or just against Burmese girls (thet khit thami), Indians and British husbands. Starting in early 1930s through 1950s, there was an explosion of publications, newspaper articles and cartoons with such social censorship. Included in the criticism were Chinese-Burmese half-castes.

Prior to the explosion in censorship of half-castes in early-20th-century Burma, Thant claims inter-cultural couples such as Burmese-Indian marriages were encouraged by the local population. The situation began to change as colonial developments, allocation of land, rice mills and socio-economic privileges were given to European colonial officials and to Indians who migrated to Burma thanks to economic incentives passed by the Raj. In the late 19th century, the colonial administration viewed intermarriage as a socio-cultural problem. The colonial administration issued circulars prohibiting European officials from conjugal liaisons with Burmese women. In Burma, as in other colonies in Southeast Asia, intimate relations between native women and European men, and the half-caste progeny of such unions were considered harmful to the white minority rule founded upon carefully maintained racial hierarchies.

China
While the term half-caste tends to evoke the understanding of it referring to the offspring of two persons of two different pure bloods or near pure bloods, in other languages, such as Mandarin Chinese, the words half-caste and mixed ethnicity or multi-ethnic are the same word, hun-xue (混血).

Fiji

Fijian people of mixed descent were called half-caste, kailoma or vasu. European and Indian immigrants started migrating to Fiji and intermarrying during the period of colonial rule. The colonial government viewed this as a “race problem”, as it created a privileged underclass of semi-Europeans who lived on the social fringes in the colonial ordering of Fiji. This legacy continues to affect the ethnic and racial discourse in Fiji.

Kailomas or vasus were children born to a Fijian native and European or indentured laborers brought in by the colonial government to work on sugarcane plantations over a century ago. Over the generations, these half-caste people experienced social shunning and poor treatment from the colonial government, which became determined in herding citizens into separate, tidy, racial boxes, which led to the separation of Fijian mixed-bloods from their natural families.

Malaysia
Half-caste in Malaysia referred to Eurasians and other people of mixed descents. They were also commonly referred to as hybrids, and in certain sociological literature the term hybridity is common.

With Malaysia experiencing a wave of immigrations from China, the Middle East, India, and southeast Asia, and a wave of different colonial powers (Portuguese, Dutch, English), many other terms have been used for half-castes. Some of these include cap-ceng, half-breed, mesticos. These terms are considered pejorative.

Half-castes of Malaya and other European colonies in Asia have been part of non-fiction and fictional works. Brigitte Glaser notes that the half-caste characters in literary works of the 18th through 20th century were predominantly structured with prejudice, as degenerate, low, inferior, deviant or barbaric. Ashcroft in his review considers the literary work structure as consistent with morals and values of colonial era where the European colonial powers considered people from different ethnic groups as unequal by birth in their abilities, character and potential, where laws were enacted that made sexual relations and marriage between ethnic groups as illegal.

New Zealand
The term half-caste to classify people based on their birth and ancestry became popular in New Zealand from the early 19th century. Terms such as Anglo-New Zealander suggested by John Polack in 1838, Utu Pihikete and Huipaiana were alternatively but less used. The term has a stigma and is highly offensive there.

South Africa

Sociological literature on South Africa, including the pre-colonial, colonial and apartheid eras, refers to half-caste as anyone born from admixing of White and people of color. An alternate, less common term, for half-caste was Mestizzo (conceptually similar to Mestizo in Latin American colonies).

Griqua (Afrikaans: Griekwa) is another term for half-caste people from intermixing in South Africa and Namibia.

People of mixed descent, the half-caste, were considered inferior and slaves by birth in the 19th-century hierarchically arranged, closed colonial social stratification system of South Africa. This was the case even if the father or mother of half-caste person was a European.

Also, during the apartheid eras, Indians were treated as the upper middle class that was virtually superior to half-caste Coloreds.

United Kingdom
In the United Kingdom, the term when used primarily applies to those of mixed Black and White parentage, although can extend to those of differing heritages as well.

Sociologist Peter J. Aspinall argues that the term was coined by 19th-century British colonial administrations, and eventually started to be used as a descriptor of multiracial Britons in the 20th century who had partial white ancestry. From the 1920s to 1960s, Aspinall argues it was "used in Britain as a derogatory racial category associated with the moral condemnation of 'miscegenation'".

The National Union of Journalists has stated that the term half-caste is considered offensive today. The union's guidelines for race reporting instructs journalists to 'avoid words that, although common in the past, are now considered offensive'. NHS Editorial guidance states documents should 'Avoid offensive and stereotyping words such as coloured, half-caste and so forth'.

Half-caste in other colonial empires

The term half-caste was common in British colonies, however it was not exclusive to the British Empire. Other colonial empires such as Spain devised terms for mixed-race children. The Spanish colonies devised a complex system of castas, consisting of mulattos, mestizos, and many other descriptors. French colonies used terms such as Métis, while the Portuguese used the term mestiço. French colonies in the Caribbean referred to half-caste people as Chabine (female) and Chabin (male). Before the American Civil War, the term mestee was commonly applied in the United States to certain people of mixed descent.

Other terms in use in colonial era for half-castes included - creole, casco, cafuso, caburet, cattalo, citrange, griffe, half blood, half-bred, half-breed, high yellow, hinny, hybrid, ladino, liger, mamaluco, mixblood, mixed-blood, mongrel, mule, mustee, octoroon, plumcot, quadroon, quintroon, sambo, tangelo, xibaro. The difference between these terms of various European colonies usually was the race, ethnicity or caste of the father and the mother.

Ann Laura Stoler has published a series of reviews of half-caste people and ethnic intermixing during the colonial era of human history. She states that colonial control was predicated on identifying who was white and who was native, which children could become citizens of the empire while who remained the subjects of the empire, who had hereditary rights of a progeny and who did not. This was debated by colonial administrators, then triggered regulations by the authorities. At the start of colonial empires, mostly males from Europe and then males of indentured laborers from India, China and southeast Asia went on these distant trips; in these early times, intermixing was accepted, approved and encouraged. Over time, differences were emphasised, and the colonial authorities proceeded to restrict, then disapprove and finally forbid sexual relationships between groups of people to maintain so-called purity of blood and limit inheritable rights.

See also

General concepts
Race (human classification)
Caste
Miscegenation
Euphemism treadmill

Historical applications of the mixed-caste concept
Between white/European and black/African:
Mulatto
Quadroon
Octoroon

Between white/European and Native American / American Indian:
Mestee
Métis, a people descended from fur traders (Scottish and French-Canadian) and their native wives
Mestizo, a word common in Latin America, particularly Mexico

Between white and Asian:
Kutcha butcha
Anglo-Indian
Luso-Indian
Burgher people, Sri Lankan people of partly European ancestry
Eurasian (mixed ancestry)
Indo people (similar group in the Dutch East Indies)

Other:
Mischling (formerly used German expression for a person of mixed ancestry. In Nazi Germany term for persons defined under the Nuremberg Laws as being non-Jewish but as having a significant amount of Jewish ancestry/"blood". Since then regarded as pejorative.)

In literature:
Half Caste (poem)
Half-elf (also "halfling" under some uses of the term), a human–elf hybrid featured in many works of fantasy literature and, as a character class and/or a description of a non-playing character, in many role-playing games derived from or inspired by the fantasy genre

References

Caste
Ethnic and religious slurs
Multiracial affairs